St Patrick's College was an independent Catholic school in Melbourne, Victoria from 1854 until 1968. It was the second independent school and the first Catholic secondary school in Victoria founded with a government grant of £2,500.  In 1865, following financial difficulties, it was transferred to the care of the Society of Jesus (Jesuits).  The school became immediately important to the intellectual and spiritual life of the Catholic community of Victoria and remained so for its existence. The College was a member of the Associated Catholic Colleges from 1928–1948.

The school was shut down at the end of 1968 in order to provide space for a new Catholic diocesan chancery. After significant public opposition the buildings were demolished in 1970. Over 5000 students attended the school between its foundation and closure. The St Patrick's Old Collegians' Association continues to exist.

Notable alumni
Keith Brennan (1915–1985) – diplomat
Vincent Buckley (1925-1988) - poet, essayist
Frank Costigan (1931–2009) – lawyer
Michael Costigan (1931- ) – writer and public servant
Henry Doyle (1859–1929) – politician
John Nash (1857–1925) – politician
Jack O'Hagan (1898–1987) – singer-songwriter and radio personality
 Richard Michael "Dick" Pirrie (1920–1944) – VFL Footballer, Naval Officer, died in the D-Day Landings of 6 June 1944
 Joseph Santamaria – judge of the Court of Appeal, Supreme Court of Victoria
Thomas Fidelis Hawkins, (1940-1946), Commonwealth Bank of Australia

Rectors
 Rev. Thomas Cahill SJ (1874-1878)
 Rev. William Lockington SJ (1916-1923)

References

External links

Educational institutions established in 1854
Catholic schools in Melbourne
Demolished buildings and structures in Melbourne
Educational institutions disestablished in 1968
Defunct schools in Victoria (Australia)
Buildings and structures demolished in 1970
1854 establishments in Australia
1968 disestablishments in Australia
East Melbourne, Victoria